Agbor Gilbert Ebot (born Agbor Gilbert Ebot; 8 January 1983) is a Cameroonian award-winning film producer. His success as a filmmaker includes Before Sunrise, The Blues Kingdom, The Land of Shadow, Pink Poison and Far. He has a broader focus on African cinema, founder of The Cameroon International Film Festival ( CAMIFF' ) aims to promote the Cinema of Cameroon both economically and culturally through exchanges, mutual understanding and co-operation between filmmakers and countries.

He recently received a Medal of Honor from the President of Cameroon Paul Biya.

Early life
Gilbert was born to Cameroonian and Nigerian parents. His father is a Cameroonian from Mamfe in Manyu Division while his mother came from Cross River state in Nigeria. He studied at the Government Technical High School (GTHS) in Mamfe.

 Career 
Agbor Gilbert did not attend any technical school for film. In 2003, he met Jeta Amata, Fred Amata, Olu Jacobs and Rita Dominic in Calabar while they were shooting a movie. He often visited the location as he was always sent out of class on account of not having the right textbooks or tools. Each time he returned to the location, he would sit there and help as a production assistant on the set, and that is how his interest in film grew.
In September 2017, he represented Cameroon movie industry at the Heroes in the Struggle Awards in Los Angeles and he said  

 Controversy 
Ebdot made controversial threats against blogger and LGBT activist Bandy Kiki, stating that ''...If I catch you for Cameroon, I go 'rape' you well well so that di demon of lesbianism go comot for your body...I get plans to give you belle..."

 Filmography 

 Pink Poison (2012)
 The Blues Kingdom (2007)
 The Land of shadow (2014)
 Far (2014 film)''

See also 

List of Cameroonian Actors
Cinema of Cameroon

References

External links 
 

Living people
Cameroonian film directors
Cameroonian male actors
1983 births
Cameroonian people of Nigerian descent